Hope Hull, also known as McGehees Switch, is an unincorporated community in Montgomery County, Alabama, United States, southwest of Montgomery.

It is home to the drive-through zoological park Alabama Safari Park.

History
Hope Hull, a stop on the Mobile and Montgomery Railroad was originally known as McGehees Switch in honor of local planter Abner W. McGehee. McGehee later changed the name of the community to Hope Hull, in honor of a Methodist circuit rider he met while living in Georgia.
A post office operated under the name McGehees from 1875 to 1877, and first began operation under the name Hope Hull in 1877.

Hope Hull is home to Hooper Academy, and also the location of Tankersley Rosenwald School, which is listed on the U.S. National Register of Historic Places.

Notable people
 Bibb Graves, Governor of Alabama from 1927 to 1931 and 1935 to 1939.
 Lou Thornton, former outfielder for the Toronto Blue Jays.
 Lucille Times, civil rights activist.

References
 Encyclopædia Britannica World Atlas, 1958 Edition, p. 72.

External links
 Hooper Educational Academy home page

Unincorporated communities in Montgomery County, Alabama
Unincorporated communities in Alabama